Laryngeal cartilages are cartilages which surround and protect the larynx. They form during embryonic development from pharyngeal arches. There are a total of nine laryngeal skeleton in humans: 
 Thyroid cartilage - unpaired
 Cricoid cartilage - unpaired
 Epiglottis - unpaired
 Arytenoid cartilages - paired
 Corniculate cartilages - paired
 Cuneiform cartilages - paired
Skeletal system